The 1965 New Mexico Lobos football team was an American football team that represented the University of New Mexico in the Western Athletic Conference (WAC) during the 1965 NCAA University Division football season.  In their sixth season under head coach Bill Weeks, the Lobos compiled a 3–7 record (2–3 against WAC opponents) and were outscored, 226 to 127.

Quarterback Stan Quintana and Dave Hettema were the team captains. The team's statistical leaders included Quintana with 444 passing yards, Carl Jackson with 665 rushing yards and 60 points scored, and Woody Dame with 198 receiving yards.

Schedule

References

New Mexico
New Mexico Lobos football seasons
New Mexico Lobos football